The Tadpole Galaxy, also known as UGC 10214 and Arp 188, is a disrupted barred spiral galaxy located 420 million light-years from Earth in the northern constellation Draco. Its most dramatic feature is a trail of stars about 280,000 light-years long. Its size has been attributed to a merger with a smaller galaxy that is believed to have occurred about 100 million years ago. The galaxy is filled with bright blue star clusters triggered by the merger, some containing as many as one million stars. It is the largest disrupted spiral galaxy of its sort.

It is hypothesized that a more compact intruder galaxy crossed in front of the Tadpole Galaxy—from left to right from the perspective of Earth—and was slung around behind the Tadpole by their mutual gravitational attraction. During this close encounter, tidal forces drew out the spiral galaxy's stars, gases and dust, forming the conspicuous tail. The intruder galaxy, estimated to lie about 300,000 light-years behind the Tadpole, can be seen through foreground spiral arms at the upper left. Following its terrestrial namesake, the Tadpole Galaxy will likely lose its tail as it grows older; the tail's star clusters forming smaller satellites of the large spiral galaxy.

Two supernovae are known to have occurred in the Tadpole Galaxy. SN 2007cu was discovered on June 27, 2007 with an apparent magnitude of 18.9, and SN 2008dq was discovered on June 25, 2008 with an apparent magnitude of 18.3.

An image of the galaxy was taken by Hubble's Advanced Camera for Surveys (ACS) in April 2002, containing 6000 background galaxies spanning billions of light-years.

References
NASA - This article contains text from NASA, which is in the public domain.

External links

ESA/Hubble Release

Barred spiral galaxies
Peculiar galaxies
Draco (constellation)
10214
57129
188